Mondariz Fútbol Club, is a Spanish football club based in the municipality of Mondariz. They currently play in Preferente Autonómica – Group Sur, the fifth tier of Spanish football.

Season to season

External links
Futbolme.com profile

Football clubs in Galicia (Spain)
Divisiones Regionales de Fútbol clubs
Association football clubs established in 1967
1967 establishments in Spain